Kathleen White may refer to:

Kathleen Merrell White (1889−1973), American Protestant minister and author
Kathleen Hartnett White (born c. 1949), American government official and environmental policy advisor

See also
Kathleen Whyte (1909−1996), Scottish embroiderer and art teacher